Nexsen Pruet, LLC is a large business law firm headquartered in Columbia, South Carolina.

The firm ranked 197 on The American Lawyer magazine's 2019 "Am Law 200" list, an annual ranking of U.S. firms by revenue per lawyer, compensation, profits per lawyer, profitability index, value per lawyer, profits per equity partner, and overall revenue.

Offices 
Nexsen Pruet has more than 180 attorneys practicing in eight offices. Five offices are in South Carolina, in Columbia (headquarters office), Greenville, Charleston, Hilton Head, and Myrtle Beach. Three are in North Carolina, in Charlotte, Raleigh, and Greensboro.

Nexsen Pruet attorneys represent businesses and individuals from a wide range of industries including: agriculture; chemistry, biotechnology and pharmaceutical; construction; economic development; energy; health care; hospitality and tourism; manufacturing; real estate; and telecommunications.

Notable attorneys and alumni 
 J. Michelle Childs, judge of the United States District Court for the District of South Carolina.
 Bob Coble, former mayor of Columbia, South Carolina (1990–2010).
 Franklin Daniels, Chairman of the Myrtle Beach Area Chamber of Commerce.
 James Holshouser, former governor of North Carolina (1973–1977), former vice chairman of the state House Judiciary Committee and Rules Committee.
 Reginald Lloyd, director of the South Carolina Law Enforcement Division and former United States Attorney for the District of South Carolina.
 Angus Macaulay, President-Elect of the South Carolina Bar Association.
 Ernest C. Pearson, former Assistant Secretary for Economic Development, North Carolina Department of Commerce.
 Tom Stephenson, chairman of the board of trustees, Medical University of South Carolina.
 William Walter Wilkins, former chief judge of the United States Court of Appeals for the Fourth Circuit, former Chair of the United States Sentencing Commission.
 Marguerite Willis, former director of the South Carolina Chamber of Commerce.
 Susan Potsdam, former director of South Carolina Marketing Association.

Notes

Law firms based in South Carolina